In the Castle by the Lake (German: Im Schloß am See) is a 1918 German silent drama film directed by Eugen Burg and starring Wanda Treumann, Reinhold Schünzel, and Karl Beckersachs.

Cast
 Wanda Treumann as Ilka Terfani
 Reinhold Schünzel as Erich von Strehsen 
 Curt Bauer as Gutsinspektor 
 Karl Beckersachs as Paul von Wiecken 
 Eugen Burg as Baron Heidecker 
 Rudolf Döllong as Bodo 
 Cläre Praetz as Annemarie

References

Bibliography
 Bock, Hans-Michael & Bergfelder, Tim. The Concise CineGraph. Encyclopedia of German Cinema. Berghahn Books, 2009.

External links

1918 films
Films of the German Empire
German silent feature films
Films directed by Eugen Burg
German black-and-white films
1918 drama films
German drama films
Silent drama films
1910s German films